Hayaghat Railway station is situated in Sirnia, Darbhanga district, Bihar. The station code of Hayaghat is HYT. Hayaghat is not a major railway station, only a few long-distance trains stop here.  14 Express Trains and 10 Passenger Trains stop at Hayaghat station. The nearest main railway station to Hayaghat is Laheriasarai railway station (LSI) which is about 11  km away.

Platforms
There is only one platform at Hayaghat railway station.

Trains
Hayaghat railway station is a station of the East Central Railways. It is located on the Samastipur and Madhubani rail routes.
Here are some trains that are passing through Hayaghat railway station:
 Jaynagar–Anand Vihar Garib Rath Express
 Gangasagar Express
 Intercity-Express
 Saryu Yamuna Express,
and many more.

Nearest airports
The nearest airports to Patna Junction are:
 Lok Nayak Jayaprakash Airport, Patna
 Gaya Airport, Gaya
   [Darbhanga Airport]]'[ darbhanga

See also
 Darbhanga

References

Samastipur railway division
Railway stations in Darbhanga district
Transport in Darbhanga